The Ferrymead 125 celebration was an event to celebrate 125 years of Rail transport in New Zealand. The event was held over a week from 17 to 24 October 1988, with trains running in, and to and from Christchurch.

Excursions
The first excursion during the event was on 22 October, with a return excursion bound for Timaru with a 20 total train, which was hauled by the Glenbrook Vintage Railways JA 1250 and Mainline Steams J 1211. This excursion was the first steam-hauled train on the Main South Line since 1971, and also J 1211s first train since being restored. The second excursion for the event was a four-car total train to Springfield, and hauled by the Diesel Traction Groups DG 772 and DE 511. This ran on the morning of 23 October, the same day as the cavalcade. The third and last excursion was another double-headed steam excursion to Arthur's Pass, and again hauled by JA 1250 and J 1211, with another 20 total train on 24 October.

Shuttle trains
Shuttle trains to Lyttelton and Rangiora ran over a week and were both steam hauled. The Lyttelton shuttle trains ran from the former Christchurch Railway Station, to the Ferrymead Railway where the train travelled to the Ferrymead station, and then on to Lyttelton, and then returned to Christchurch. The shuttles were hauled by the Canterbury Railway Societys C 864, and with an eight-total train in tow.

The Rangiora shuttles were held in the evenings and were hauled by the Rail Heritage Trusts W 192, with a five-total train in tow. On the second evening, W 192 suffered steaming issues and was replaced by C 864. But the 'W' later returned for the remaining shuttles.

Steam Trek '88
"Steam Trek '88" was an operation to move preserved equipment down for the Ferrymead 125 celebrations. The Trek involved a round trip of 18 days from Auckland to Christchurch, and covered over 1000 km each way.  It was organised by the Railway Enthusiasts Society and the Glenbrook Vintage Railway.

The train left Auckland on 14 October with JA 1250 and GVR No.1 (WW 480) at the head, and a UC tank wagon, two high-side LC wagons, two ZAT wagons, four AA carriages, and an FM van.  At Pukekohe, WW 480 was detached from the train due to an mechanical issue developing. The trek reached the South Island on 17 October, and arrived in Christchurch on 19 October.

The return journey began on 25 October, when JA 1250 travelled from Christchurch to Waipara, where the 'JA' was used on the Weka Pass Railway. The train left Waipara the day after, and arrived in Wellington on 28 October. The "Trek" train arrived back in Auckland on 31 October.

The Cavalcade
On Sunday, 23 October a cavalcade was held at the Christchurch Railway Station. Locomotives and rolling stock moved slowly along the third road as a large crowd watched.

The list of locomotives and rolling stock involved in the cavalcade:

 A 64 from The Plains Railway, L 1939 high-side wagon, and F 78 guards van, both from the Canterbury Railway Society
 C 132 from the Silver Stream Railway, and an LA class high-side wagon
 D 16 and A 421 Half-Birdcage carriage from the Pleasant Point Museum and Railway
 F 13, F 372 guards van and A 516 "Elevated roof" carriage from the Canterbury Railway Society
 W 192 from the Rail Heritage Trust of New Zealand, and A 222 "low roof" carriage and F 624 "Fell brake" van
 DC4922 and a CB class coal hopper wagon from the New Zealand Railways Corporation
 DJ3643 from the New Zealand Railways Corporation and A 1320 Northerner Sleeping carriage from Western Springs Railway
 DX5402, EO68 from the New Zealand Railways Corporation, a J 3525 class sheep wagon from the Canterbury Railway Society, E 7200 four-wheel wagon, and JX 14 covered bogie wagon also from the New Zealand Railways Corporation
 DF6104 from the New Zealand Railways Corporation
 AB 699 from the Pleasant Point Railway, WD 357 and YB 291 ballast hopper wagon both from the Canterbury Railway Society, and AB 608 and X 442 from the New Zealand Railway and Locomotive Society
 CB 113 from the Canterbury Railway Society, NA 3591 flat-deck wagon from the New Zealand Railways Corporation, WAB 794 from the New Zealand Railway and Locomotive Society, NA 4411, also from the New Zealand Railways Corporation, and Fowler 548 from Steam Scene
 C 864 from the Canterbury Railway Society, Craven Crane NO. 200 from the Craven Crane Group (now owned by Steam Incorporated), and LC high-side wagon, and KB 968 from the Ferrymead Trust
 DSC2746 and FM 883 guards van from the New Zealand Railways Corporation
 RM 56 - from the Federation of Rail Organisations of New Zealand
 DSG 3114 - from the New Zealand Railways Corporation
 J 1211 from the Mainline Steam Heritage Trust, with two M class low-side wagons, one K class and W 400 ventilated box wagons from the Canterbury Railway Society (the 'W' only) 
 JA 1250 and two AA wide-body carriages from the Glenbrook Vintage Railway
 DE 511 from the Diesel Traction Group, with EO 3, EC 7, EW 1806 and ED 103 from the Canterbury Railway Society
 DS 140 from Waitaki NZ, Lorneville (now on display at Oamaru), and a V class ventilated box wagon
 DG 772 from the Diesel Traction Group
 DGs 791 and 770, along with F 699 brake van and three A 50-foot carriage from the Weka Pass Railway
 V 148 from Steam Scene and an LC class high-side wagon
 DSA658 - from Ravensdown Fertiliser, Hornby
 TR 22 - from the Canterbury Railway Society

See also
 NZ Rail 150

References

Further reading 

Rail transport in Canterbury, New Zealand
1980s in Christchurch
October 1988 events in New Zealand
Events in Christchurch
1988 in New Zealand